A number of vessels of the People's Liberation Army Navy have borne the name Nantong, after the capital Nantong.

 , a Type 053H frigate. In service from 1977 until 2012.
 , a Type 054A frigate, in service since 2019.

References 

People's Liberation Army Navy ship names